Lahu may refer to:
 Lahu people
 Lahu language

See also
Laho (disambiguation)